Krisztina Pigniczki (born 18 September 1975) is a Hungarian former handball player and Olympic medalist. She received a silver medal at the 2000 Summer Olympics in Sydney, and a silver medal at the 2003 World Women's Handball Championship in Croatia. She became European champion in 2000 with the Hungarian national team, and received a bronze medal in 1998 and in 2004.

Achievements
Nemzeti Bajnokság I:
Winner: 2003, 2004
Silver Medalist: 2002, 2005, 2008
Bronze Medalist: 1998, 1999, 2000, 2001, 2007
Magyar Kupa:
Winner: 2002, 2004
Silver Medalist: 2008
Olympic Games:
Silver Medalist: 2000
World championship:
Silver Medalist: 2003
European championship:
Winner: 2000
Bronze Medalist: 1998, 2001

References

External links
 Profile at Handball.hu

1975 births
Living people
People from Makó
Hungarian female handball players
Olympic silver medalists for Hungary
Handball players at the 2000 Summer Olympics
Handball players at the 2004 Summer Olympics
Handball players at the 2008 Summer Olympics
Olympic handball players of Hungary
Olympic medalists in handball
Expatriate handball players
Hungarian expatriates in France
Győri Audi ETO KC players
Medalists at the 2000 Summer Olympics
Sportspeople from Csongrád-Csanád County